O Amor, o Sorriso e a Flor is a studio album by João Gilberto, released in Brazil in 1961. The Portuguese title translates to The Love, the Smile and the Flower and is taken from the original lyrics of Antônio Carlos Jobim and Newton Mendonça's "Meditação", which is included in the album.

The album was initially released in the United States in 1960 as Brazil's Brilliant João Gilberto (Capitol ST 10280).

Richard S. Ginell, writing in AllMusic, says, "This vitally important record introduced João Gilberto, Antonio Carlos Jobim and thus, bossa nova to the United States in 1961, a year before Stan Getz scored a hit with "Desafinado.... Several Jobim standards-in-waiting -- "One Note Samba," "Corcovado," "Meditation," "Outra Vez"—were heard for the first time in North America on this LP."

Track listing

Credits 
 Artwork - César Gomes Villela
 Photography - Francisco Pereira
 Producer - Aloysio de Oliveira

References

Gridley, Mark. Jazz Styles: History and Analysis. 9th. NJ: Pearson Prentice Hall, Print.

1960 albums
João Gilberto albums
Odeon Records albums